Lelu (English: Toy) is the second studio album by Finnish singer-songwriter Sanni. The album was preceded by the chart-topping lead single "2080-luvulla".

Singles
The album's lead single, "2080-luvulla" was released on 13 February 2015. The song has peaked at number-one on the Finnish airplay and downloads charts, while it peaked it number-three on the singles chart. The song holds the record for longest consecutive run at number-one on the Finnish airplay charts of all-time with eleven weeks. "Pojat" was released as the second single on 16 May 2015 alongside the video for the song. Sanni confirmed in July that "Supernova" will be released as the third single.

Track listing

Charts

Weekly charts

Release history

References

2015 albums
Sanni (singer) albums
Finnish-language albums
Warner Music Group albums